She was born in Russia, a student of Veaki and Rontiris, she changed, with some times, in a characteristic role with laughs, she began with Marika Kotopouli's company, employed with Katerona of Manolidou-Aronis-Horn company, she enlisted herself for a decade in the power of the National Theatre and played with Lambeti - Horn, Moussouri, Katrakis, Vergis, Myrat (Murat), Vougiouklaki, Alexandrakis, Galineas, Dandoulaki, Ferti, Denissis, Kalogeropoulou and many others, received her little stone in the history of Greek theatre.  She presented for many years (from 1939) on stage, on screen and on television.

Louiza Podimata died on 9 March 2001.

Filmography

Film

Television

External links
Louiza Podimata at RetroDB 

2001 deaths
Greek actresses
Soviet emigrants to Greece